The United States' Federal Bureau of Investigation instituted an Honorary Medals Program in 1989 as a way of recognizing "exceptional acts" by FBI employees and other law enforcement personnel working with the FBI.  These medals were created to supplement the then-existing reward system within the Bureau.  There are four medals in the program intended for personnel: the FBI Star, the FBI Medal for Meritorious Achievement, the FBI Shield of Bravery, and the FBI Medal of Valor. One additional medal, the FBI Memorial Star, is for a surviving relative when a death has occurred in the line of duty. These medals are considered to be among the highest honors granted by the FBI, and fewer than 400 had been awarded as of March 2009.

The FBI Star 

One recipient of the FBI Star is Major Peter Norton of the British Army, who was severely injured when he triggered a secondary explosive device while attempting to clear an area where five American soldiers had been killed by a roadside bomb.  Norton was also awarded the George Cross—the highest British award for acts of gallantry which did not take place in action directly against enemy forces, and also awarded for civilian gallantry—for this incident.

The FBI Medal for Meritorious Achievement 

Supervisory Special Agent Harold Bickmore of the FBI was awarded the Medal for Meritorious Achievement for saving the life of a sixteen-year-old girl whom he found on the ground not breathing at the scene of a traffic accident on a major four-lane highway. He administered first aid on the spot, including CPR without any protection from blood-borne disease.

The FBI Shield of Bravery 

Shields of Bravery were awarded to Special Agent Ronald C. Eowan, Regional Security Officer Earl Miller of the State Department, and former Special Agent Paul Myers. They spent nearly four years in Indonesia under primitive conditions orchestrating a "highly complex ruse" that led to the arrests of 12 terrorists and the disruption of their network.

The FBI Medal of Valor 

Special Agent Robert Merta was grazed by a bullet when he tackled a fugitive prison escapee who had drawn his gun on Merta and three other agents when they tried to arrest him. Merta received the Medal of Valor for risking his life to protect his fellow agents.

Special Agent Edmundo Mireles Jr. earned the Medal by ending the Miami Shootout April 11, 1986. Despite being severely wounded by rifle fire, Mireles was able to engage the suspects, killing them. Mireles was the first one to receive the Medal of Valor in 1986.

The FBI Memorial Star 

The family of Special Agent Paul M. Sorce, who died as a result of an auto accident in the line of duty, was given a Memorial Star.

References 

 FBI Honorary Medals
Awards established in 1989
 FBI Honorary Medals